ownerIQ is a media technology company that provides online advertising solutions and marketing channels for brands, retailers, and manufacturers. The company was founded by Jay Habegger and has offices in Boston, New York City, Chicago, San Francisco, Seattle and Toronto.

History
Habegger founded OwnerIQ in 2007 after selling Bitpipe, Inc. for $40 million to TechTarget. In 2012, the company acquired DijiPOP, an on-demand shopper marketing technology platform. OwnerIQ owns ManualsOnline.com. The online directory provides guides for appliances, TV and Video, electronics, power tools, and other consumer goods.

Products
The company offers ownership targeting, retailer targeted marketing, vendor targeted marketing, and pre-roll capability that enables advertisers to target shoppers from specific premium retailer sites and other e-commerce websites.

References 

Companies based in Boston
Online advertising services and affiliate networks